Sir John Henry Ritblat   (born 3 October 1935) is an English property developer. He is honorary president (and formerly chairman and CEO) of The British Land Company PLC, an FTSE100 London-based property company that George Soros's G Soros Realty Investors acquired a stake in during 1993.

Early life
Ritblat was born in 1935 in Hampstead, North London, England. He was educated at Dulwich College, The Hall School, Hampstead and the College of Estate Management.

Career
He acquired British Land from Jim Slater in 1970 for £1m, and retired as chairman in 2006.

Since June 2001, Ritblat has served as the non-executive chairman of property advisory Colliers CRE.

 He also serves as the chairman of the advisory board of Delancey, the property and asset-backed investment firm founded in 1995 by his son Jamie Ritblat (born 1967), which owns the Alpha Plus Group of schools of which Sir John is the chairman of the board of governors.

Political activity
He has donated to the Conservative Party. In August 2018 Jim Fitzpatrick MP forwarded a letter to the Crown Estate that made unsubstantiated allegations about the 2010 off-market sale of the Royal Mint Court freehold to DV4, a wholly-owned subsidiary of Delancey based in the British Virgin Islands and questioning the Crown Estate's relationship with the Ritblat family.

Philanthropy
He is chairman of the board of trustees of the Wallace Collection, chairman of the governing body of The London Business School and Honorary Fellow, a member of the Council of The Royal Institution and honorary president of The British Ski & Snowboard Federation, deputy chairman of The Royal Academy of Music and Honorary Fellow.   Hon. Fellow of The Royal Institute of The British Architects.  D.Litt. London Metropolitan University.  Vice chairman of The International Students House.

The John Ritblat gallery of the British Library houses some of the finest items in the library's collection for public display; it is named after him since he was a major benefactor during the building of the gallery and donated one million pounds towards the gallery's display cases.

He is also vice chair of International Students House, London.

Personal life
He has been married twice. His second wife, Jill (Zilkha née Slotover), is a philanthropist. He has two sons, Jamie Ritblat (b 1967) and Nick Ritblat, and a daughter, Suki Ritblat.

References

External links
 Alpha Plus on Delancey website

1935 births
Living people
Academics of London Business School
British businesspeople
People from Hampstead
People educated at Dulwich College
People associated with the Royal Academy of Music
People associated with the Wallace Collection
Conservative Party (UK) people
Knights Bachelor
British Land people
Alumni of University College of Estate Management